Brother Joseph Thamby (11 November 1890 – 15 January 1945) was a Roman Catholic religious brother of the Third Order of the Capuchins. He was declared Servant of God on 24 June 2007 by the Vatican. He is well known for his virtues, prayer and miracles in South India.

Early life 
Thamby was born to Savarimuthu Thamby and Annamalle on 11 November 1890 in Saigon, Vietnam, where his parents were employed at the time of his birth and the family returned to their native town Pondicherry, India, when he was two years old. His younger brother Michael Dariyan was born in India, when he was five years old. His mother died when he was seven years old and his father remarried.

Missionary life 
Because of suppression from his step mother, Thamby left the house and joined the hermits. There he learnt about St. Francis of Assisi and started following his footsteps. He Joined Capuchins in 1924 at Sardhana, Uttar Pradesh, India. He left Capuchins in 1933 but remained a member of the Third Order and hence wore the Third Order habit for the rest of his life. He promoted Franciscan Third Order to everyone he met and so established the branches wherever he went. He spent his life as a travelling missionary and travelled throughout South India.

Stigmata 
He is also believed to have received the stigmata which have been witnessed by many priests and parishioners. As per the witnesses the blood used to ooze from his hands, feet and the side of the chest every Friday at 3 pm.

Death 
Thamby died on 15 January 1945 at 5 pm, the date of death and time he had already foretold. He was buried in the parish cemetery of Avutapally Parish, Andhra Pradesh, India.

Canonization 
Brother Joseph Thamby was declared a Servant of God by the Vatican on 24 June 2007, thus starting the canonization process for him.

References

See also 
List of saints of India

1890 births
1945 deaths
Servants of God
Stigmatics
People from Ho Chi Minh City
Vietnamese Roman Catholics